Events in the year 1861 in Belgium.

Incumbents 
Monarchy of Belgium: Leopold I
Head of government: Charles Rogier

Events 
January
 1 January – Franco-Belgian Tirailleurs renamed Papal Zouaves.

February
 7 February – François Robyn (Br Hugo in religion) sentenced to death at the Court of assizes in Mons for arson at Scourmont Priory the previous October.

May
 1 May – Commercial treaty with France modelled on the Anglo-French commercial treaty of 1860.
 19 May – Association "Vlamingen Vooruit!" organises mass meeting in Brussels
 27 May – Commercial treaty with France ratified.

June
 1 June – Commercial treaty with France comes into effect.
 11 June – Partial legislative elections of 1861

July
 20 July – Signing of Treaty of Amity, Commerce and Navigation between Belgium and Mexico negotiated by Auguste t'Kint.

October
 1 October – Commercial treaty between Britain, France and Belgium comes into effect.
 10 October – Commercial treaty with the Ottoman Empire signed at Constantinople by Gaston Errembault de Dudzeele for Belgium and by Esad Safvet and Mohammed Djemil for the Sublime Porte.

Publications 
Periodicals
 Annuaire de l'Académie Royale des Sciences, des Lettres et des Beaux-Arts de Belgique, 27 
 La Belgique Horticole, vol. 11.
 Bulletin de la Fédération des Sociétés d'Horticulture
 Bulletin Usuel des Lois et Arrêtés, 1539–1813 (Brussels)
 Collection de précis historiques, vol. 10, edited by Edouard Terwecoren S.J.
 La Tribune du peuple (Brussels) begins publication
 Revue belge et étrangère, 12
 Het Vlaemsch Verbond begins publication

Reports and pamphlets
 Bulletin administratif du Ministère de l'Intérieur, series 1 (1830–1847), vol. 1 (1830-1831).
 Recueil des lois et arrêtés royaux de Belgique, vol. 48 (Brussels, Imprimerie du Moniteur Belge)
 Charles Le Hardy de Beaulieu, L'Espagne et son avenir commercial: Des relations à créer entre la Belgique et l'Espagne (Brussels: A. Lacroix, Verboeckhoven et Cie.)

Literary and historical writing
 Adolphe Borgnet, Histoire des Belges à la fin du XVIIIe siècle
 Charles De Coster, Contes brabançons
 Gustave Oppelt, Histoire générale et chronologique de la Belgique, de 1830 à 1860 (Brussels, M. Hayez)
 Auguste Scheler, Trente années de la littérature belge (Brussels: Aug. Schnée)
 William Henry James Weale, Notes sur Jean van Eyck (Brussels: A. Lacroix, Verboeckhoven et Cie; London: Barthes & Lowell)

Music
 Barthélemy-Antoine Bauwens, Le plain-chant mis à la portée de tout le monde (Paris and Brussels: Casterman)
 Henri Vieuxtemps, Violin Concerto No. 5

Births 
 Elisabeth Wesmael, graphic artist (died 1953)
 6 January – Victor Horta, architect (died 1947)
 11 March – Francis Dhanis, colonial administrator (died 1909)
 2 April – Ernest van Dyck, singer (died 1923)
 20 April – Arthur Van Gehuchten, anatomist (died 1914)
 5 July – Fernand Cocq, politician (died 1940)
 12 July – Eugène Broerman, painter (died 1932)
 13 August – Fernand Brouez, magazine publisher (died 1900)
 16 August – Diana Coomans, painter (died 1952)
 27 August – Aloïs de Beule, sculptor (died 1935)
 1 September – Louis Bernheim, general (died 1931)
 3 September – Ursmer Berlière, historian (died 1932)
 9 October – Henri Privat-Livemont, artist (died 1936)
 21 October – Charles van Lerberghe, poet (died 1907)
 3 November – Louis Ruquoy, soldier (died 1937)
 6 November – Germain Morin, patrologist (died 1946)
 10 December – Guillaume Van Strydonck, painter (died 1937)

Deaths 
 5 April – Ferdinand de Meeûs (born 1798), politician
 8 April – Édouard Wacken (born 1819), poet and dramatist
 24 September – Michael Joseph François Scheidweiler (born 1799), horticulturalist
 27 October – Marcellin Jobard (born 1792), photographer
 3 December – Henry Voordecker (born 1779), painter
 25 December – Jacobus Josephus Eeckhout (born 1793), painter

References 

 
Belgium
Years of the 19th century in Belgium
1860s in Belgium
Belgium